The 2023 season is the 109th in Remo's existence. This season Remo participate in the Campeonato Brasileiro Série C, the Campeonato Paraense, the Copa do Brasil and the Copa Verde.

Players

Squad information

Notes:
 Numbers in parentheses denote appearances as substitute.
 Y – Youth players to have featured in a first-team matchday squad for Remo.

Top scorers

Disciplinary record

Kit
Supplier: Volt Sport / Main sponsor: Banpará

New contracts and transfers

New contracts

Transfers in

Transfers out

Competitions

Campeonato Brasileiro Série C

First stage

Matches

Campeonato Paraense

Group stage

Matches

Copa do Brasil

First round

Second round

Copa Verde

Round of 16

Quarter-finals

References

External links
Official Site 
Remo 100% 
Globo Esporte 

2023 season
2023 in Brazilian football
Clube do Remo seasons